T. proximus may refer to:
 Tachinus proximus, a beetle species in the genus Tachinus
 Thamnophis proximus, a snake species
 Thymus proximus, a plant species in the genus Thymus
 Typhlodromips proximus, a mite species in the genus Typhlodromips
 Tyrannochthonius proximus, a pseudoscorpion species in the genus Tyrannochthonius

See also
 Proximus (disambiguation)